Hasanabad Bey Baba (also Romanized as Ḩasanābād Bey Bābā; also known as Ḩoseynābād Bey Bābā, Ḩoseynābād, and Ḩoseynābād-e Morādābād) is a village in Mirbag-e Shomali Rural District, in the Central District of Delfan County, Lorestan Province, Iran. At the 2006 census, its population was 511, in 107 families.

References 

Towns and villages in Delfan County